According to an anonymous Roman author of the 4th century CE, the producer of the Chronography of 354, Ziezi was a son of Shem and a grandson of Noah. His name is mentioned in the excerpt Ziezi ex quo vulgares meaning "Ziezi, of whom the Bulgars" but being regarded as the first reference to the Bulgars as a people.

Honour
Ziezi Peak on Greenwich Island in the South Shetland Islands, Antarctica is named after Ziezi.

Notes

354
Bulgars